Ersi (also Romanized as Ersī; also known as Arasi Hoomeh, Īrseh, and Orosī) is a village in Koshksaray Rural District, in the Central District of Marand County, East Azerbaijan Province, Iran. At the 2006 census, its population was 1,659, in 391 families.

References 

Populated places in Marand County